The geospatial summary of the High Peaks/Summits of the Juneau Icefield is a compilation of the basic geospatial properties (location, elevation and prominence) of the peaks/summits within the general area of the Juneau Icefield located North and East of Juneau, Alaska extending north to Skagway, Alaska. The peaks are classified by elevation: 2000 m, 2050 m, 2100 m, 2150 m, 2200 m, 2250 m, 2300 m and above 2400 m. Most (216, %) of the 272 summits compiled have not been assigned an official name by the United States Geological Survey (USGS) Geographic Names Information System (GNIS) and as such are delineated as "Un-Named" (UNP in the KML file).

In addition, select minor peaks are included to report those that are contained within the GNIS database and to permit assigning a location marker (coordinate) for Nunatak identification and ridge delineation for the USGS Hydrologic Unit Code boundaries for cross referencing these areal shapes to a single coordinate.

The elevation of the peaks and summits of the Juneau Icefield was determined by referencing multiple sources including:
GNIS database
BC Geographical Names (BCGN) database
USGS topographic maps
United States Forest Service (USFS) topographic maps
Natural Resources Canada (NRC) topographic maps
Peakbagger.com with cross-referencing to USGS and USFS
Selected other sources (such as scientific papers).

The GNIS database consistently reports the peak elevation lower than the referenced USGS and/or USFS topographic maps. The topographic maps also report lower elevations than selected GPS measurements conducted by personnel of the Juneau Icefield Research Program, but not to the degree of the GNIS database.

In this article, the topographic map values were used to report elevation above mean sea level (MSL), unless a more accurate GPS measurement was available.

Juneau Icefield High Peaks summary

Summits below 2000 m

The following table contains selected peaks within the boundaries of the Juneau Icefield that have an elevation range below . These are included for Nunatak topography determination purposes.

There are 74 peaks within this elevation range.
There has been 1 peak that has been ascended.
There are 23 named peaks.
There are 51 peaks that have not been named.

Summits from 2000 m to 2050 m

There are 47 peaks within this elevation range.
There are 4 peaks that have been ascended.
There are 7 named peaks.
There are 40 peaks that have not been named.

Summits from 2050 m to 2100 m

There are 50 peaks within this elevation range.
There are 3 peaks that have been ascended.

There are 10 named peaks.

There are 40 peaks that have not been named.

Summits from 2100 m to 2150 m

There are 53 peaks within this elevation range.

There has been 4 peaks that have been ascended.

There are 5 named peaks.
There are 48 peaks that have not been named.

Summits from 2150 m to 2200 m

There are 35 summits/peaks within this elevation range.
Four peaks have been ascended.

There are 5 officially named peaks.

There is 1 unofficially named peak.
There are 30 peaks that have not been named.

Summits from 2200 m to 2250 m

There are 28 peaks within this elevation range.
Two peaks have been ascended.
There are 5 officially named peaks and 2 unofficially named peaks.
There are 21 peaks that have not been named.

Summits from 2250 m to 2300 m

There are 19 peaks within this elevation range.

There has been 1 peak that has been ascended.

There are 11 named peaks.

There are 8 peaks that have not been named.

Summits from 2300 m to 2400 m

There are 17 peaks within this elevation range.
Five peaks have been ascended.

There are 9 officially named peaks.
There are 0 unofficially named peaks.

There are 8 Peaks that have not been named.

Summits above 2400 m

There are 3 peaks within this elevation range.
There are 3 named peaks.
There are 0 peaks that have not been named.

Summit topographic prominence

The Clean Prominence, Optimistic Prominence and Isolation should be verified for a First Ascent attempt.
The following table contains all peaks/summits within the boundaries of the Juneau Icefield whose prominence has been determined. The values for Key Col elevation, Isolation distance, Isolation Location and peak prominence were obtained from Peakbagger.com

First ascents

The first ascent climbs for major peaks within the Juneau Icefield area .

International Boundary Line peaks and monuments

These peaks and monuments (survey markers) were designated as part of the Alaska Boundary Settlement of 1903 and associated later surveys. Elephant Promontory is not an official Boundary Peak even though it lies on the International Boundary Line. It was added to assist in delineating the boundary. The peaks in the table below are those that are adjacent to the Juneau Icefield.

The Coordinates provided above were taken from the most current satellite photographs(Google Earth Pro) and as such represent the most accurate representation of the location of the boundary peak. Topographic maps of this area are dated (see USGS Historical Topographic maps) and do not provide the accuracy of the Global Positioning System that recent Satellite photographs have. Boundary Peaks 87–91 and 112–117 are not actually summits, but monuments (survey markers) placed by the U.S. National Geodetic Survey.

USGS Geographic Names Information System omissions

The following table contains those geographical features that utilize a name that has not been entered into the USGS Geographic Names Information System database. The sources of the names are from local references and scientific papers.

See also
Geospatial Summary of the Research and Recreational facilities within the Juneau Icefield area
List of Boundary Peaks of the Alaska–British Columbia/Yukon border
List of glaciers and icefields
USGS Historical Topographic Maps for the Juneau Icefield area

Sources

Mapping systems

Geographical information systems
BC Geographical Names (BCGN) database

Peakbagger.com database

Bivouac database

Other
American Alpine Club publications

Crevasse Zone publications

Organizations, club newsletters, blogs, reports etc.

General references

Research references
USGS Geonames
Juneau Icefield Research Project (1949-1958) by Cal Heusser
CalTopo
DeLorme

Mountains of British Columbia
Mountains of Alaska